Kasemets is an Estonian surname (meaning birch forest). Notable people with the surname include: 

Tõnis Kasemets (born 1974), Estonian racing driver
Udo Kasemets (1919–2014), Estonian-born Canadian composer

See also
Kasemetsa, village in Estonia
Kaasik, Estonian surname also meaning birch forest

Estonian-language surnames